Andrusia Lake is a lake in Beltrami County, Minnesota, in the United States.

Andrusia Lake was named for Andrew Jackson, 7th President of the United States.

See also
List of lakes in Minnesota

References

Lakes of Minnesota
Lakes of Beltrami County, Minnesota